Brodeur is a French-Canadian surname. Notable people with the surname include:

 Bernard Brodeur, Canadian politician
 Christopher X. Brodeur, musician and cartoonist
 Denis Brodeur (1930–2013), Canadian photographer
 Edmond Brodeur, Canadian politician
 Louis-Philippe Brodeur (1862–1924), Canadian politician and Supreme Court judge
 Martin Brodeur, Canadian ice hockey player
 Mike Brodeur, Canadian ice hockey player
 Mylène Brodeur, Canadian figure skater
 Paul Brodeur, American author and science writer
 Richard Brodeur (born 1952), Canadian ice hockey player
 Yves Brodeur, Canadian diplomat